Rhaptonema is a genus of flowering plants belonging to the family Menispermaceae.

Its native range is Madagascar.

Species:

Rhaptonema bakeriana 
Rhaptonema cancellata 
Rhaptonema densiflora 
Rhaptonema glabrifolium 
Rhaptonema latifolia 
Rhaptonema swinglei 
Rhaptonema thouarsiana

References

Menispermaceae
Menispermaceae genera